The Matsu dialect (Eastern Min:  / ) is the local dialect of Matsu Islands, Taiwan. Native speakers also call it Bàng-huâ, meaning the language spoken in everyday life. It is recognised as one of the statutory languages for public transport announcements in Lienchiang County, Taiwan.

The dialect is a dialect of the Fuzhou dialect of Eastern Min. The Matsu dialect is quite similar to the Changle dialect, another subdialect of the Fuzhou dialect.

Phonology

The Matsu dialect has 17 initials, 46 rimes and 7 tones.

Initials

// and // exist only in connected speech.

Rimes
There are 46 rimes in the Matsu dialect.

Many rimes come in pairs: in the table above, the one to the left represents a close rime, while the second represents an open rime. The close/open rimes are closely related with the tones (see below).

Tone

The relationship between tone and rime
In the Matsu dialect, level tone, rising tone and light entering should be read in close rimes; departing tone and dark entering should be read in open rimes.

For example, "" have two pronunciations, // in close rime and // in open rime; "" have two pronunciations, // in close rime and // in open rime. This is summarized in the table:

Sandhi and assimilation

Tone sandhi
The Matsu dialect has extremely extensive tone sandhi rules: in an utterance, only the last syllable pronounced is not affected by the rules. The two-syllable tonal sandhi rules are shown in the table below (the rows give the first syllable's original citation tone, while the columns give the citation tone of the second syllable):

In mordern spoken language, it's hard to distinguish with each other in individual syllable, but we can find their differences in tone sandhi.

Like the Fuzhou dialect, the tonal sandhi rules of more than two syllables display further complexities.

Initial assimilation
The two-syllable initial assimilation rules are shown in the table below:

Rime tensing
In the Matsu dialect, if the rime type of the former syllable is changed while tone sandhi occurred, the rime of the former syllable should be changed to adapt the rule of close/open rimes.

For example, ""  is a syllable which has dark departing tone, it's an open rime; ""  has a dark level tone. When combined as the phrase "" (technician),  "" changes its tonal value to rising tone.

References

Further reading

External links
  Fuzhou Dialect Textbook: Elementary school textbook in Matsu.
  Another elementary school textbook in Matsu
  教師使用手冊下載 Teaching resources for elementary school teachers of the Matsu dialect
  An Easy Learning Course
  120 Basic Words and Phrases
  Differences in common vocabulary between the Matsu dialect and the Fuzhou dialect
  馬祖閩東語本字檢索系統 Mandarin-Matsu 'Original Character' Search System

Eastern Min
Languages of Taiwan
Matsu Islands